Persuasive Percussion was an LP album performed by Terry Snyder and the All Stars and released in 1959 by Command Records (run by Enoch Light). The packaging includes the first use of the gatefold cover which, upon being unfolded, lists information about each selection. The liner notes state that the album may be used to test audio equipment, due to the stereo placement of sounds independently in either the left or right channel (something common today, but extremely innovative in 1959). The album cover artwork, by Josef Albers, is minimalistic in style, consisting of an arrangement of dots. The album was the first volume in a series of Persuasive Percussion releases. Provocative Percussion was the second release of the Percussion albums. Both Persuasive Percussion and Provocative Percussion had four volumes released over the next several years.

In April 1960, the album reached number 1 on The Billboard's Stereo Action Albums chart,and stayed at the top for 13 weeks. It spent a total of 124 weeks on the top selling albums charts.

In 1965 Cash Box magazine stated, "Persuasive Percussion Vol. 1 was perhaps the LP that put the stereo disk on the map. Much like Milton Berle, whose antics in the early days of TV was credited with selling millions of sets, this album undoubtedly brought to light the startling musical aspects of stereo sound on records".

Track listing
 "I'm in the Mood for Love"
 "Whatever Lola Wants"
 "Misirlou"
 "I Surrender Dear"
 "Orchids in the Moonlight"
 "I Love Paris"
 "My Heart Belongs to Daddy"
 "Tabú"
 "Breeze and I"
 "Aloha Oe"
 "The Japanese Sandman"
 "Love Is a Many Splendored Thing"

Credits
 The Command All-Stars	Primary Artist
 Dominic Cortese	Accordion
 Dick Hyman	Organ, Piano
 Jack Lesberg	Bass
 Enoch Light	Primary Artist
 Art Marotti	Percussion
 Tony Mottola	Guitar
 Cole Porter	Composer
 Willie Rodriguez	Bongos, Percussion
 Terry Snyder	Drums
 Todd Sommer	Drums
 Stanley Webb	Woodwind

References 

1959 albums
Command Records albums
Enoch Light albums
Albums with cover art by Josef Albers